Blackberry Farm may refer to:

 Blackberry Farm (books), a series of children's books
 Blackberry Farm (Tennessee), a farm and resort in Walland, Tennessee